Eudonia diphtheralis is a species of moth in the family Crambidae. It is endemic to New Zealand.

The larvae feed on grasses, herbs and bryophytes.

Original description
In 1884 Edward Meyrick wrote:

References

Moths described in 1866
Eudonia
Moths of New Zealand
Endemic fauna of New Zealand
Endemic moths of New Zealand